P. Santhosh Kumar or P. Sandosh Kumar is a member of Rajya Sabha from Kerala and a leader of the Communist Party of India. P. Sandosh Kumar was born to K. P. Prabhakaran and P. V. Radha in 1971 at Padiyoor in Irikoor, Kerala. He is serving as CPI Kannur district secretary and state council member. He was the former A.I.Y.F. national general secretary and president.

References

Malayali politicians
Kerala politicians
Politicians from Kannur
Living people
Communist Party of India politicians from Kerala
Rajya Sabha members from Kerala
Year of birth missing (living people)